Coimbatore Junction railway station, also known as Kovai Junction railway station (station code: CBE),  is the primary railway station serving Coimbatore city.

History

Train service in Coimbatore with construction of the Old_Coimbatore Railway Station at Podanur started on 18 July 1861, upon the construction of the Podanur–Madras line connecting Kerala and the west coast with the rest of India. Coimbatore lies on the Coimbatore–Shoranur  broad gauge. Current Coimbatore Railway Junction was started as a halt station #Old_Coimbatore (Podanur) to Mettupalayam Branch line. It was built then opened on 1 February 1873, two months before MGR Chennai Central was opened as Madras Central. Until 1956, the Coimbatore Railway Division was functioning with Podanur as the headquarters. In 1956, the headquarters was shifted to Olavakkode, of Kerala state and was named Olavakkode railway division. In 1980, Olavakkode division was renamed Palakkad railway division. It comprised Kerala and western districts of Tamil Nadu. A new Salem railway division was carved out of the Palakkad railway division in 2006 with Salem as its headquarters. The city falls under the Salem Division of the Southern Railway zone of Indian Railways. Coimbatore is one among the top hundred booking stations of Indian Railways.

Background 
It is one of the major train stations in South India. It is one of the A1 graded station in the Southern Railway. This station comes under the jurisdiction of Salem division of Southern Railways and contributes to 50% of the revenues of the zone. It is one of the top booking stations in India according to Indian Railways. Chennai Main, Egmore, Madurai Junction, Coimbatore Junction and Chennai Central are the most profitable stations of Southern Railways.

Lines

The station is a junction formed by the following 4 lines:
 Jolarpettai–Peelamedu-Coimbatore line double line, 1891
 Coimbatore–Shoranur line double line 1862 (Then as Single Line)
 Coimbatore–Pollachi line single line 1891 (Then as Meter Gauge Single Line)
 Coimbatore–Mettupalayam branch line single line 1873
 Coimbatore–Nanjundapuram-Vellalore-Irugur line single line 1873

Suburban stations
The other stations serving Coimbatore include  (CBF),  (PTJ),  (IGU),  (MDKI),  (PLMD),  (SHI),  (SUU),  (PKM),  (TDE) and Somanur (SNO).

Connections
The terminus is connected to all the major places within the city such as:

Town Hall - 0.5 km
Coimbatore Integrated Bus Terminus - 10.1 km
Gandhipuram Central Bus Terminus - 2.3 km
Singanallur Bus Terminus - 7.9 km
Ukkadam Bus Terminus - 1.0 km
Podanur Junction - 6.4 km
Coimbatore International Airport - 12.4 km.

See also
 Podanur Junction railway station
 Coimbatore North Junction railway station
 Transport in Coimbatore

References

External links 

Salem
Railway stations in Coimbatore
Railway junction stations in Tamil Nadu
Indian Railway A1 Category Stations